Presidente Perón Partido is a partido located in the Greater Buenos Aires urban area in Buenos Aires Province, Argentina.

Name

The partido is named in honour of Juan Domingo Perón (1895-1974), who served as President of Argentina, he served two terms between 1946 and 1955, but he was removed from office by a military coup. He served a third term between 1973 and 1974 but died in office.

Districts
Guernica (capital)
América Unida
Villa Numancia

External links
Official Website (Spanish)

 
1993 establishments in Argentina
Partidos of Buenos Aires Province